Igreja de Santa Luzia is a church in Lisbon, Portugal. It is classified as a National Monument.

See also
Catholicism in Portugal

References

Roman Catholic churches in Lisbon
National monuments in Lisbon District